The Libertador Municipality is one of the 18 municipalities (municipios) that makes up the Venezuelan state of Aragua and, according to the 2011 census by the National Institute of Statistics of Venezuela, the municipality has a population of 114,355. The town of Palo Negro is the municipal seat of the Libertador Municipality.

Name
The municipality is one of a number in Venezuela named "Libertador Municipality", in honour of Venezuelan independence hero Simón Bolívar.

Demographics
The Libertador Municipality, according to a 2007 population estimate by the National Institute of Statistics of Venezuela, has a population of 87,520 (up from 78,427 in 2000). This amounts to 5.3% of the state's population.

Government
The mayor of the Libertador Municipality is Gonzalo Díaz, re-elected on October 31, 2004, with 47% of the vote.  The municipality is divided into two parishes; Capital Libertador and San Martín de Porres (created on January 30, 1995).

References

Municipalities of Aragua